The Nigeria Governors' forum is a non-partisan platform that was created to enhance collaboration among the executive governors of Nigeria.

Aims and objectives
Forum for public policy discussions 
Promote inclusive governance
Promote sustainable development
Promote collaboration between the governors and society

References

Organizations based in Nigeria